Steel & Copper is a collaborative EP by Nigerian singer Burna Boy and American production duo DJDS. The EP comprises 4 tracks and was released on March 21, 2019, through Spaceship Entertainment, Bad Habit, Atlantic Records and Loma Vista Recordings. It is the follow-up to Burna Boy's third studio album Outside and DJDS' fourth studio album Big Wave More Fire. Steel & Copper blends Burna Boy’s upbeat melodies with DJDS' slinky trap beats.

Composition
Steel & Copper combines elements of dancehall and reggae music with Afropop and trap. The EP's title track "34" is a reference to Giannis Antetokounmpo's jersey number; the song first appeared in a freestyle Burna Boy did for Link Up TV's Behind the Barz. In "Innocent Man", Burna Boy talks about surviving in the cold; he switches from melodic flows to fast paced rapping. In the Rastafarian-influenced track "Darko", he voices his frustrations with the authorities and why he is not bothered about the things people say about him; the song begins with an upbeat piano sound and references his 2014 hit record "Don Gorgon". In "Thuggin", Burna Boy narrates the deep tale of living life despite all the people he's lost; the song is composed of a guitar-led R&B beat that is reminiscent of a church choir worship session. Ehis Ohunyon of Pulse Nigeria praised the song's structure and content.

Releases
The visuals for "Thuggin/Darko", a merger of the songs "Thuggin" and "Darko", was released on April 1, 2019. It was directed by  Daniel Regan and features styling from Nigerian fashion photographer Stephen Tayo. The video contains spiritual elements and is a depiction of life and death; it also contains melancholic images of Burna Boy caring for a motherly figure in his home before engaging in a street fight that turns deadly for one of the men involved.

Critical reception

Steel & Copper received generally positive reviews from music critics. Pulse Nigeria's Ehis Ohunyon awarded the EP 3 stars out of 5, saying it "succeeds through sheer force of will, cutting edge style and his simple approach to achieving excellence". In contrast, Ohunyon criticized its length and said it "lacks the gusto to leave a memorable mark in the mind of listeners". Debola Abimbolu of Native magazine said Steel & Copper is a continuation of the genre-bending antics that DJDS explored on their 2018 album Big Wave More Fire; Abimbolu also commended Burna Boy for helping the duo explore the sound of Afropop. Adam Nosalik of The Spill Magazine gave the EP 4 stars out of 5, commending it for being a well put-together project. Notiki Bello of Filter Free Nigeria called the EP "smooth" and said "there is no noticeable sonic glitch in any of the songs".

Track listing

Release history

References

2019 EPs
Burna Boy albums
Albums produced by DJDS